Lucas Piton Crivellaro (born 9 October 2000) is a Brazilian footballer who plays as a left back for Vasco da Gama.

Club career
On 28 December 2022, Piton was announced as a Vasco da Gama player ahead of the 2023 season, signing a four-year contract. He was officially presented on 6 January 2023. On his debut, he assisted Nenê for the opening goal in a 2–0 win against Portuguesa, earning comparisons from Vasco fans to former winger Felipe Maestro.

Career statistics

Club

References

External links

2000 births
Living people
Brazilian people of Italian descent
People from Jundiaí
Footballers from São Paulo (state)
Brazilian footballers
Association football defenders
Campeonato Brasileiro Série A players
Sport Club Corinthians Paulista players
CR Vasco da Gama players